James W. Wagner (born 1953) served as the 19th President of Emory University in Atlanta, Georgia from 2003 to 2016. From 2000 to 2003, he served as Provost and interim President of Case Western Reserve University.

Biography
James W. Wagner was born in Silver Spring, Maryland in 1953. He received a B.S. in electrical engineering from the University of Delaware in 1975 and an M.S. in clinical engineering in 1978 from the Johns Hopkins University School of Medicine. In 1984, he received a PhD from Johns Hopkins in materials science and engineering.

He started his career as a Professor at Johns Hopkins. He also worked at the United States Food and Drug Administration. From 1998 to 2000, he served as Dean at Case Western Reserve University, and from 2000 to 2003 he was Provost and interim President. According to the New York Times, Wagner received $1,040,420 in total compensation at Emory in 2008.

In 2009, he became a fellow at the American Academy of Arts & Sciences. He also serves on the boards of The Carter Center, the Georgia Research Alliance, SunTrust Banks, the Metro Atlanta Chamber of Commerce, the Atlanta Regional Council for Higher Education, and the Woodruff Arts Center.

He is a Presbyterian.

Controversy
In February 2013, President Wagner wrote an essay in the Emory Magazine entitled "As American as... Compromise" in which he used the Three-Fifths Compromise as an example of pragmatic compromise that Emory University should emulate. He wrote, "One instance of constitutional compromise was the agreement to count three-fifths of the slave population for purposes of state representation in Congress... Both sides found a way to temper ideology and continue working toward the highest aspiration they both shared—the aspiration to form a more perfect union. They set their sights higher, not lower, in order to identify their common goal and keep moving toward it." The essay sparked controversy on Emory's campus and attracted national and international media attention and an apology from Wagner.  Per the New York Times, Wagner "acknowledged both the nation’s continuing education in race relations and his own." Leslie Harris, an Emory history professor who has worked to address issues of race at the college, countered that “[t]he three-fifths compromise is one of the greatest failed compromises in U.S. history .... Its goal was to keep the union together, but the Civil War broke out anyway.”

References

External links
Emory University Biography of Wagner

1953 births
Living people
People from Silver Spring, Maryland
American Presbyterians
University of Delaware alumni
Johns Hopkins School of Medicine alumni
Case Western Reserve University faculty
Presidents of Emory University
Fellows of the American Academy of Arts and Sciences
Presidents of Case Western Reserve University